Mohammed Kabbaj (born 1946) was the Wali (governor) of Greater Casablanca, one of the old 16  Regions of Morocco. He was Minister of Economy and Finance from February 1995 to August 1997.

References 

1946 births
Living people
Finance ministers of Morocco
Moroccan politicians
People from Casablanca
Advisors of Mohammed VI of Morocco